The Old Central Grammar School (also known as the Haines City Middle School Annex or Fellowship Dining-Ridge) is a historic school in Haines City, Florida. Built in 1925, it was designed by architect Edward Columbus Hosford in the Mediterranean Revival and Spanish Revival style.

On March 17, 1994, it was added to the U.S. National Register of Historic Places. After being used for several years as a community theatre, the building is now part of Daniel Jenkins Academy of Technology, a middle school in the Polk County Public Schools district.

Gallery

References and external links
 Florida's Office of Cultural and Historical Programs
 Polk County listings
 Clay Cut Centre

References

External links

 Daniel Jenkins Academy

Edward Columbus Hosford buildings
National Register of Historic Places in Polk County, Florida
Mediterranean Revival architecture in Florida
Spanish Revival architecture in Florida
Haines City, Florida
School buildings completed in 1925
1925 establishments in Florida